Ceralocyna parkeri is a species of beetle in the family Cerambycidae. It was described by Chemsak in 1964.

References

Ceralocyna
Beetles described in 1964